Micrurus corallinus is a species of highly venomous elapid snake native to South America (Brazil, Argentina and Paraguay). There are no recognized subspecies.

Common names 
Common names of this species include painted coral snake, cobra coral pintada, mboi-chumbe, vibora de coral, boicora, bocora, coral-verdadeira, ibiboboca, and mboi-yvyvovo.

Description and Behavior 
It is a snake with nocturnal habits found on the coastlines, through leaves, on top of logs and stones, its diet is based on lizards, other snakes (including coluibrids), amphisbenids and gymnophils.

The head color is black with a white or yellow back band, which narrows strongly in a dorsal shape, the bodies have wide red rings that are separated by a series of 15–27 (usually 17–21) by wide and narrow black rings and with white borders. The tail has 3 to 8 alternating black and yellow rings. They have a slim body, with a moderately short tail in the case of males and very short in the case of females, the head is round, small and a little distant from the neck. The eyes are slightly small with round pupils. It has smooth and shiny dorsal scales, without apical punctuation. The supra-anal keels are absent in males.

Distribution and habitat 

Its range includes South America in Brazil (Rio Grande do Sul, Rio Grande do Norte, Bahia, Santa Catarina, Espírito Santo), northeastern Argentina (Misiones), and Paraguay. It is mainly found in the Amazon basin in tropical deciduous and evergreen forest at elevations ranging from sea level to 500 m.

Reproduction 
Reproduction is oviparous, laying up to 15 eggs.

Venom 
It is not aggressive towards humans, the group of coral snakes represents only 1% of accidents in Central and South America, however the venom produced by them is highly potent, with neurotoxic action, causing neuromuscular block, which results in death from respiratory arrest, resulting from paralysis of the respiratory muscles. The LD50 for a 5–27 grams mouse is 0,007 mg. 0.2 mg/kg (intramuscular injection), 0.09 mg/kg (intraperitoneal) and 0.04 mg/kg (intravenous).

The venom of this species is compound of the three-finger toxin families, Phospholipase A2, L-amino acid oxidase, True venom lectin, SVMP (snake venom metalloproteinase), Kunitz-type inhibitor (Venom Kunitz-type), NGF (NGF -beta) and Waprin. The amount of venom extracted from this species is 3 mg. The venom of this species has presynaptic activity. M. corallinus has alpha-neurotoxins with pre-synaptic activity that causes a high and spontaneous release of acetylcholine associated with the postsynaptic block of the electrical transmission between the nerve and the muscle.

References

External links

Corallinus
Snakes of South America
Reptiles of Brazil
Reptiles of Argentina
Reptiles of Paraguay
Reptiles described in 1820
Taxa named by Blasius Merrem